Deirdre O'Connell is an American character actress who has worked extensively on stage, screen, and television. She has won a Tony Award and been nominated for Drama Desk Awards, among other awards and nominations.

Early life
O'Connell grew up in Massachusetts. She is the oldest of three children of Anne Ludlum, playwright and actress, and Thomas E. O'Connell, founding president of Berkshire Community College. She attended Taconic High School. O'Connell enrolled at Antioch College in Ohio, but withdrew before graduating.

Career
O'Connell began her career at Stage One, an experimental theatre at the Boston Center for the Arts. She made her Broadway debut in the 1986 revival of The Front Page, and was nominated for the 1991 Drama Desk Award for Outstanding Featured Actress in a Play for her performance in the off-Broadway production Love and Anger. She is the recipient of two Drama-Logue Awards and a Los Angeles Drama Critics Circle Award for her stage work in Los Angeles.

O'Connell made her screen debut in Tin Men. Additional film credits include State of Grace, Straight Talk, Leaving Normal, Fearless, City of Angels, Hearts in Atlantis, Imaginary Heroes, Eternal Sunshine of the Spotless Mind, Wendy and Lucy, What Happens in Vegas, Secondhand Lions, and Synecdoche, New York.

She was a regular on L.A. Doctors and has made numerous guest appearances on series such as Kate & Allie, Chicago Hope,  The Practice, Six Feet Under, Law & Order: Criminal Intent, and Nurse Jackie. From 1994 to 2010, O'Connell appeared on six episodes of Law & Order, four of them as Dr. Valerie Knight, Anita Van Buren's oncologist in Season 20.

Awards and nominations
In 2020, O'Connell received a Special Citation from the New York Drama Critics' Circle for career excellence, including her performance in Lucas Hnath's Dana H. at the Vineyard Theatre. She also won the 2010 Ovation Award for Featured Actress in a Play for the role of Judy in the Center Theatre Group production of In the Wake. She received 2020 Lucille Lortel Award for Outstanding Solo Show performance in Lucas Hnath's Dana H. and Lifetime Achievement Award in 2022.

O'Connell was given a special Obie Award in 2005 for sustained excellence of performance and was given a Best Actress award in 2020 for her performance in Dana H. 

In 2022, she won the Tony Award for Best Actress in a Play for Dana H.

Filmography

Film

Television

References

External links

Deirdre O'Connell at the Lortel Archives

Living people
21st-century American actresses
20th-century American actresses
Actresses from Massachusetts
American film actresses
American stage actresses
American television actresses
People from Pittsfield, Massachusetts
Tony Award winners
Place of birth missing (living people)
Year of birth missing (living people)